Therese Lewis (1911-1984) was an American screenwriter, author, and producer who worked in radio, film, and television in the 1940s up through the 1960s.

Biography 
Originally intending to be an actress, Lewis began her career as a player in the Cincinnati Stuart Walker Company before working in publicity, writing commercials, and then working as a story editor.

She moved into radio when she began producing and editing Helen Hayes' Sunday radio program while writing articles for publications like Town and Country. She eventually forged a successful career for herself as a film and television writer before becoming a producer on the '60s TV soap Peyton Place. She also served as script editor on the program NBC's Television Playhouse.

She married Hubbell Robinson, a CBS executive she met while working in radio, in 1940. After their divorce in the early 1950s, she dated actor Alexander Kirkland.

She died of emphysema in New York City in 1984.

Selected filmography 
As a producer:

 Peyton Place (1964–1965)

As a writer:

 Goodyear Playhouse (TV, 1957 episode "Rumblin' Galleries")
 Matinee Theatre (TV, 1956 episode "A Man and a Maid")
 Schlitz Playhouse (TV, 1953 episodes "The Perfect Secretary" and "The Governess")
 Robert Montgomery Presents (TV, 1953 episode "The Wind Cannot Read")
 What a Woman! (1943)

References 

1911 births
1984 deaths
Deaths from emphysema
American women screenwriters
20th-century American women writers
20th-century American screenwriters
American television writers
Writers from Cincinnati
Television producers from Ohio